Euskaltel–Euskadi is a Spanish UCI ProTeam road cycling team founded in 2008. It was initially an amateur team, but upgraded to Continental level in 2018.

Having spent two years as a UCI Continental team, the team registered their interest to become a UCI ProTeam for the 2020 season, and were granted a ProTeam licence in December 2019. In February 2020, it was announced that Spanish telecommunications company Euskaltel were to become the team's title sponsor for four years, from that year's Tour of the Basque Country – later cancelled due to the COVID-19 pandemic in Spain. The company had sponsored the previous  team between 1998 and 2013, before the team disbanded.

Team roster

Major wins
2015
Stage 3 Ronde de l'Isard, Xabier San Sebastián
2019
Stage 4 Volta ao Alentejo, Sergio Higuita
2021 
Vuelta a Murcia, Antonio Jesús Soto
Stage 1 Volta ao Alentejo, Juan José Lobato
2022
Stage 4 Volta ao Alentejo, Xabier Azparren
Stage 5 Volta ao Alentejo, Juan José Lobato

Supplementary statistics
Sources:

References

External links

 
UCI Continental Teams (Europe)
UCI Professional Continental teams
Cycling teams based in Spain
Cycling teams established in 2008
Cycle racing in the Basque Country (autonomous community)